Nurse is an American medical drama television series that aired on CBS from April 2, 1981 to May 21, 1982. Series star Michael Learned won an Emmy Award for Outstanding Lead Actress in a Drama Series in 1982 for her role on the show.  It was based on the bestselling book Nurse (1979) by Peggy Anderson.

Synopsis
The series follows Mary Benjamin, the supervising nurse at Grant Memorial Hospital in New York City who returned to work after the death of her physician husband.

Cast
 Michael Learned as Nurse Mary Benjamin
 Robert Reed as Dr. Adam Rose
 Hattie Winston as Nurse Toni Gilette
 Bonnie Hellman as Nurse Penny Brooks
 Hortensia Colorado as Nurse Betty LaSada
 Dennis Boutsikaris as Joe Calvo
 Clarice Taylor as Nurse Baily
 Christopher Marcantel as Chip Benjamin
 Rex Robbins as Dr. Greg Manning

Episode list

Pilot (1980)

Season 1 (1981)

Season 2 (1981–82)

References

External links
  (series)
  (pilot)

1981 American television series debuts
1982 American television series endings
CBS original programming
1980s American drama television series
1980s American medical television series
Television series by CBS Studios
English-language television shows
Works about nursing
Television shows set in New York (state)